Perseftim (stands for Persatuan Sepakbola Flores Timur) is a Indonesian football team based at Gawerato Stadium, East Flores Regency, East Nusa Tenggara. This team competes in Liga 3 East Nusa Tenggara Zone.

Supporters
Perseftim has a supporter named Perseftim Mania. Perseftim supporters are known as one of the biggest and fanatical bases of supporters in East Nusa Tenggara.

References

External links

East Flores Regency
Football clubs in East Nusa Tenggara